Scotorythra rara is a moth of the family Geometridae. It was first described by Arthur Gardiner Butler in 1879. It is endemic to the Hawaiian islands of Kauai, Oahu, Molokai, Maui and Hawaii.

The larvae feed on Acacia koa, Cheirodendron gaudichaudii, Cibotium, Cyrtandra, Elaeocarpus, guava, Metrosideros, Melicope, Pipturus, Rubus hawaiiensis, Sapindus, Straussia and Vaccinium.

External links

R
Endemic moths of Hawaii
Biota of Hawaii (island)
Biota of Kauai
Biota of Maui
Biota of Oahu